Bastiaan Lijesen (born 28 December 1990 in Nieuwerkerk aan den IJssel) is a Dutch swimmer. At the 2012 Summer Olympics he finished 23rd overall in the heats in the Men's 100 metre backstroke and failed to reach the semifinals.

References

External links
 

1990 births
Living people
Olympic swimmers of the Netherlands
Swimmers at the 2012 Summer Olympics
Dutch male backstroke swimmers
People from Nieuwerkerk aan den IJssel
Sportspeople from South Holland
21st-century Dutch people